William S. Higgins was the coach for the Gonzaga University men's basketball team during the 1915–16 season. His record at Gonzaga stands at 2–7 (.222) during his tenure at Gonzaga.

References

Year of birth missing
Year of death missing
American men's basketball coaches
Gonzaga Bulldogs football coaches
Gonzaga Bulldogs men's basketball coaches